Neon Blonde was a supergroup consisting of Johnny Whitney and Mark Gajadhar from The Blood Brothers. They were based in Kirkland, Washington, a suburb of Seattle. The two expanded beyond The Blood Brothers' sound by utilizing a more electronic-based sound, which included electroclash and dance-punk. Neon Blonde's music drew from many genres including post-hardcore, and experimental rock (influenced by their band The Blood Brothers and Velvet Underground's art rock), who have also teamed up with Blood Brothers members to create Head Wound City), and a more electroclash sound. Their music also featured rapping, and rapped vocals in an alternative hip hop style.

Discography 

 Headlines (Dim Mak Records, 2005)
 Chandeliers in the Savannah (Dim Mak Records, 2005)

External links
Official Myspace
Dim Mak Records
Dim Mak profile
Neon Blonde Interview, Fall 2005

References

Musical groups from Seattle
Electronic music groups from Washington (state)